Yaskain (Yaśqayın) is a rural locality (a village) in Chuyunchinsky Selsoviet, Davlekanovsky District, Bashkortostan, Russia. The population was 52 as of 2010. There is 1 street.

Geography 
Yaskain is located 37 km southeast of Davlekanovo (the district's administrative centre) by road. Chuyunchi is the nearest rural locality.

References 

Rural localities in Davlekanovsky District